Giarole is a comune (municipality) in the Province of Alessandria in the Italian region Piedmont, located about  east of Turin and about  north of Alessandria.

Giarole borders the following municipalities: Mirabello Monferrato, Occimiano, Pomaro Monferrato, and Valenza.

As historical place it is notable the Castle of Sannazzaro, built in the 12th century.

Demographic evolution

References

Cities and towns in Piedmont